William Stanley is the name of:

Politicians
 William Stanley, 3rd Baron Monteagle, (1528–1581), of Hornby Castle, Lancashire, Member of Parliament (MP) for Lancashire in 1555
 William Stanley (MP for Southampton) (1610–1678), English merchant and politician who sat in the House of Commons in 1660
 William Stanley (1640–1670), 5th son of James Stanley, 7th Earl of Derby; English MP for Liverpool
 William Owen Stanley (1802–1884), British MP and Lord Lieutenant of Anglesey
 William Eugene Stanley (1844–1910), American politician, Governor of Kansas
 William Stillman Stanley Jr. (1838–?), Wisconsin jeweler and legislator

Military figures
 William Stanley (Battle of Bosworth) (c. 1435–1495), English military leader in the Wars of the Roses
 William Stanley (Elizabethan) (1548–1630), English military commander under Queen Elizabeth I
 William A. Stanley (1831–?), American Civil War sailor and Medal of Honor recipient
 William Stanley (composer) (1820–1902) Was an English-Australian soldier and composer

Others
 William Stanley (mammalogist) (died 2015), evolutionary biologist and mammalogist
 William Stanley, 6th Earl of Derby (1561–1642), English nobleman
 William Stanley (priest) (1647–1731), English academic, Archdeacon of London and Dean of St Asaph
 William Stanley, 9th Earl of Derby (c. 1655–1702), English nobleman
 William Stanley (inventor) (1829–1909), founder of Harris Academy South Norwood school
 William Stanley (Hawaii judge) (1872–1939), Irish lawyer and judge of the Republic of Hawaii
 William Stanley (football manager), British footballer and first manager of Coventry City F.C.
 William O. Stanley, American professor
 William Stanley Jr. (1858–1916), American physicist and electrical engineer

See also
 Bill Stanley (disambiguation)